Cyperus fischerianus is a species of sedge that is native to parts of eastern Africa.

See also 
 List of Cyperus species

References 

fischerianus
Plants described in 1850
Flora of Eritrea
Flora of Ethiopia
Flora of Kenya
Flora of Malawi
Flora of Mozambique
Flora of Sudan
Flora of Tanzania
Flora of Uganda
Flora of the Democratic Republic of the Congo
Taxa named by Achille Richard